The women's 200 metres event at the 2017 Summer Universiade was held on 25 and 26 August at the Taipei Municipal Stadium in Taipei, Taiwan.

Medalists

Results

Heats
Qualification: First 3 in each heat (Q) and next 3 fastest (q) qualified for the semifinals.

Wind:Heat 1: +2.2 m/s, Heat 2: -1.9 m/s, Heat 3: -3.2 m/s, Heat 4: +0.4 m/sHeat 5: +2.2 m/s, Heat 6: -2.2 m/s, Heat 7: -1.5 m/s

Semifinals
Qualification: First 2 in each heat (Q) and the next 2 fastest (q) qualified for the final.

Wind:Heat 1: -0.7 m/s, Heat 2: -2.9 m/s, Heat 3: +0.5 m/s

Final

Wind: -1.4 m/s

References

Athletics at the 2017 Summer Universiade
2017